David Olin Melton (October 3, 1928 – October 23, 2008) was an American Major League Baseball outfielder.

Born in Pampa, Texas, he attended high school in Coronado, California, and played college baseball at Stanford University.  His minor league career (1950; 1953–1959; 1962) was spent almost entirely on the West Coast, and he was a popular member of the San Francisco Seals of the Pacific Coast League. He batted .299 for the 1955 Seals and reached career highs in home runs (19), runs batted in (116) and hits (184).

At the Major League level, Melton played in only 12 games, batted nine times, and made one hit, a single off Frank Lary of the Detroit Tigers in his first MLB at bat on April 17, 1956.

References

External links

1928 births
2008 deaths
Baseball players from California
Baseball players from Texas
Buffalo Bisons (minor league) players
Channel Cities Oilers players
Charleston Senators players
Columbus Jets players
Kansas City Athletics players
Major League Baseball outfielders
Portland Beavers players
San Francisco Seals (baseball) players
Stanford Cardinal baseball players
Ventura Oilers players
Yakima Bears players
People from Pampa, Texas